My Sweet Orange Tree is a 2012 Brazilian drama film directed by Marcos Bernstein, based on the 1968 novel of the same name by José Mauro de Vasconcelos, marking the second feature-length adaptation of the novel. Starring João Guilherme Ávila and José de Abreu, the film follows the story of Zezé, a very imaginative but misunderstood boy.

The idea of adapting the novel started in 2004, when at the request of the film's producer, Katia Machado, Marcos Bernstein and Melanie Dimantas wrote a screenplay. Later, Bernstein offered to direct the film, which was for a while a French-Brazilian production until it finished as an exclusively Brazilian film.

After filming between 2010 and 2011 in Minas Gerais, My Sweet Orange Tree premiered at the Festival do Rio on 29 September 2012. The film was released theatrically in Brazil on 19 April 2013 and received mixed reviews from critics, who highlighted Ávila's performance and Gustavo Hadba's photography.

Plot
My Sweet Orange Tree begins with José Mauro de Vasconcelos (Caco Ciocler) receiving an edition of his finished novel. Then, the film starts to tell the story from the writer's memories, through flashbacks. Eight-year-old Zezé lives in Minas Gerais in a very humble house with his family, consisting of his father, an unemployed and alcoholic, and his mother, which works to support the home and his brother and sisters. Despite the lack of understanding, affection and the aggression suffered by from his father and school colleagues, the boy has a great skill for storytelling using his imagination.

With financial difficulties, the family has to move. At the new home, Zezé finds an orange tree, which he talks every day. However, for being extremely extrovert he got involved in several confusions. One of them, he tries to ride on the bumper of Manoel "Portuga" Valadares, but is caught and spanked. The boy feels humiliated and wants revenge, however Valadares ends up understanding Zezé, which turns to share his world of fantasies, and a new friendship arises.

Cast
 João Guilherme Ávila as Zezé
 José de Abreu as Portuga
 Caco Ciocler as José Mauro de Vasconcelos
 Eduardo Dascar as Paulo, Zezé's father
 Fernanda Vianna as Selma, Zezé's mother
 Pedro Vale as Totoca
 Leônidas José as Luís
 Julia de Victa as Glória
 Kathia Calil as Jandira
 Eduardo Moreira as Ladislau
 Tino Gomes as Ariovaldo

References

External links
  
 

2012 films
2012 drama films
Brazilian drama films
Films about trees
Films based on Brazilian novels
Films set in Brazil
Films shot in Minas Gerais